Game Show Congress is a meeting of industry professionals, former contestants and fans of television game shows. It was first held in 2002.

Past Congresses

GSC 1
The first Game Show Congress was held in Boulder, Colorado as an outgrowth of the University of Colorado Program Council Trivia Bowl and was spearheaded through the efforts of Paul Bailey as a non-profit organization. Featured guests included Steve Beverly as well as Who Wants to Be a Millionaire winners Ed Toutant and Lori Bailey plus multi-show winner Leszek Pawlowicz.

GSC 2
The second Congress moved to Las Vegas and was held in conjunction with an open quiz bowl tournament. Featured speakers included former Starcade host Mark Richards, all-time Who Wants to Be a Millionaire winner Kevin Olmstead, a presentation from NTN Buzztime, a presentation about the World's Largest Trivia Contest staged each year by 90FM in Stevens Point, Wisconsin, and the first appearance of The Game Show Round, a game with elements of over 30 different game shows from around the world.

GSC 3
Moving to Burbank, California in 2004, the third Congress moved to a multi-day format and added additional competition formats such as Paul Paquet's SmartyPants tournament and The Game Show Home Game Tournament.  There was also an official Jeopardy! test and tryout. This session also marked the first time the Ralph Edwards Career Community Service Award and the Bill Cullen Career Achievement Award were presented. The Edwards award was accepted by son Gary Edwards on Ralph's behalf, while the Cullen award went posthumously to Bill Cullen (with his widow Anne accepting on his behalf).  Guest speakers honoring Edwards and Cullen included Bob Barker, Dick Clark, Jack Narz, Tom Kennedy, Jayne Meadows and Betty White. Don Pardo and Kitty Carlisle also gave taped tributes.

GSC 4
The fourth Congress in 2005 was heavily devoted to a remembrance of the longtime show Concentration and featured panel discussions with producer Norman Blumenthal and undefeated champion Ruth Horowitz.  Monty Hall was presented with the Edwards Award recognizing his long career as both a game show host, producer and philanthropist while the Cullen Award was presented to brothers Jack Narz and Tom Kennedy.  Guest speakers included comedian Shelley Berman, actress-comedian Pat Carroll, announcer John Harlan, modern era emcees Todd Newton and Guillermo Huesca, producer Stu Billett, and talent coordinator Jean Brown. Betty White, Carol Merrill and Michael Davies gave taped tributes. Jeopardy! was also recognized in five of the Congress' categories.

GSC 5
Music was added to the mix for the 2006 fifth Congress as the world's only game show cover band, the Ceramic Dalmatians, made their first live performance. J. Keith van Straaten hosted and Jim Newman directed an edition of "What's My Line, Live" with panelists Betsy Palmer, Frank Nicotero, Sarah Purcell and Stuart Shostak, while the mystery guest was Shirley Jones. There was an official test and tryout for the show "1 vs 100". A panel discussion "Working as a Game Show Host and Game Show Announcer" was led by Laura Chambers ("Weakest Link", "Greed") with Sarah Purcell, Larry Anderson, Burton Richardson, Jack Narz, Johnny Gilbert. Anderson and Richardson also teamed up as host and announcer for a charity fundraiser game of "Buzzer Battle" benefiting the AIDS Research Alliance. Bob Harris, who would later become a regular visitor of the congress, read from his book Prisoner of Trebekestan. Tic Tac Dough host Wink Martindale, producer Ron Greenberg and Thom McKee participated in a panel on the show, and there was an industry panel discussion moderated by TV host & producer Roger Rose, featuring participants Bob Boden (VP Programming, Fox Reality Channel), Stu Billet (Executive Producer, "The People's Court"), Harry Friedman (Executive Producer, "Wheel of Fortune" and "Jeopardy!"), Michael Brockman (former VP Programming CBS, ABC, and Goodson-Todman Productions), and Scott St. John (Executive Producer, "Deal or No Deal").  Longtime Hollywood Squares host Peter Marshall was presented with the Cullen Award and William Morris executive Vice President Mark Itkin was presented with the Edwards Award.  Guest speakers included Rose Marie, Betsy Palmer, Fred Silverman, Johnny Gilbert, Tom Kennedy, Kathy Garver, Harry Friedman and Al Howard.

GSC 6
The sixth Congress in 2007 was split into two sessions, one in New York City and the other in Hollywood, California. The New York session was primarily devoted to playing games and served as the North American Host of the International Quizzing Association's 2007 championship. The Los Angeles session featured a tribute to those game show icons who had passed in the previous year (Kitty Carlisle, Tom Poston and Charles Nelson Reilly), speeches by Thom McKee and Charlie O'Donnell to honor Ralph Edwards Award winner Wink Martindale plus speeches by Betty White and Sande Stewart to honor Bill Cullen Award winner Bob Stewart. White was also the winner of the newly created Arlene Francis Award honoring lifetime achievement as a game show panelist. The Ceramic Dalmatians again performed during the event. Notable attendees included Don Pardo, June Lockhart, and Betsy Palmer.

GSC 7
The 2009 event featured a Contestant Workshop by Bev Pomerantz and presentation on the history of game shows by Tom Kennedy on November 14. An awards reception was held on November 15 honoring Allen Ludden for the Bill Cullen Career Achievement award with Betty White accepting in his memory, and honoring Geoff Edwards with the Ralph Edwards Career Community Service Award. In addition Johnny Gilbert received the first Legendary Announcer award. Speakers included Bob Stewart, Tom Kennedy, and David Michaels; in addition Regis Philbin gave a taped tribute.

GSC 8
2011 featured GSC events in association with the Trivia Championships of North America on July 8–12 in Las Vegas, Nevada, USA  A panel discussion featured Ken Jennings, Bob Harris, and Ed Toutant discussing the recent Human vs Computer matches on the television game show Jeopardy!

GSC 9
The Game Show Congress presented the second Trivia Championships of North America in Las Vegas, Nevada, at the Circus Circus Hotel and Casino August 10–12, 2012.

GSC 10
The Game Show Congress presented the third Trivia Championships of North America in Las Vegas, Nevada, at the Tropicana Hotel, Resort and Casino August 9–11, 2013.

GSC 11
The Game Show Congress supported the fourth Trivia Championships of North America in Las Vegas, Nevada, at the Tropicana Hotel, Resort and Casino August 8–10, 2014.

GSC 12
The Game Show Congress supported the fifth Trivia Championships of North America in Las Vegas, Nevada, at the Tropicana Hotel, Resort and Casino August 7–9, 2015.

GSC 13
The Game Show Congress supported the sixth Trivia Championships of North America in Las Vegas, Nevada, at the Tropicana Hotel, Resort and Casino August 12–14, 2016.

GSC 14
The Game Show Congress supported the seventh Trivia Championships of North America in Las Vegas, Nevada, at the Tropicana Hotel, Resort and Casino August 4–6, 2017.

GSC 15
The Game Show Congress supported the eighth Trivia Championships of North America in Las Vegas, Nevada, at the Tropicana Hotel, Resort and Casino August 3–5, 2018.

GSC 16
The Game Show Congress supports Trivia Nationals in Las Vegas, Nevada, at the Tropicana Hotel, Resort and Casino August 8–11, 2019.

Awards

Bill Cullen Award

This award is given to the industry figure as a recognition of lifetime achievement in the area of game shows.

Recipients
2004: Bill Cullen
2005: The Narz Brothers (Jack and Jim)
2006: Peter Marshall
2007: Bob Stewart
2009: Allen Ludden

Ralph Edwards Award

This award is given to the industry figure who has contributed both to the game show community as well as the world at large.

Recipients
2004: Ralph Edwards
2005: Monty Hall
2006:  Mark Itkin
2007: Wink Martindale
2009: Geoff Edwards

Arlene Francis Award

This award is given to a panelist in honor of his or her lifetime achievement as a game show panelist.

Recipients
2007: Betty White

Legendary Announcer Award

This award is given to an announcer in honor of his or her lifetime achievement supporting the game show genre.

Recipients
2009: Johnny Gilbert

References

Game shows
Recurring events established in 2002
2002 establishments in Colorado